Lori Allen is an American businessperson, television personality, and author known for her appearances on Say Yes to the Dress: Atlanta.

She is the founder of Bridals by Lori and an advocate for breast cancer awareness.

Career 
In 1980, Allen opened the bridal salon, Bridals by Lori. In 2010, Allen and bridal consultant Monte Durham are featured in the reality television series, Say Yes to the Dress: Atlanta. Allen uses the show as a platform to advocate for breast cancer awareness. In April 2019, Allen tripped while filming a promo of Say Yes to the Dress Atlanta, leaving her with two cracked ribs, broken wrists, a broken nose, a concussion, and black eyes.

Personal life 
Allen is married to Eddie Allen. They have a son, Cory, and daughter, Mollie Surratt. In 2012, she had a double mastectomy and several surgeries to treat her breast cancer.

Selected works

References

External links 
 
 

Living people
Year of birth missing (living people)
Place of birth missing (living people)
21st-century American women writers
Writers from Georgia (U.S. state)
American women television personalities
Participants in American reality television series
20th-century American businesswomen
20th-century American businesspeople
21st-century American businesswomen
21st-century American businesspeople
Businesspeople from Georgia (U.S. state)
American women company founders
American company founders